The 1984 Minnesota House of Representatives election was held in the U.S. state of Minnesota on November 6, 1984, to elect members to the House of Representatives of the 74th Minnesota Legislature. A primary election was held on September 11, 1984.

The Independent-Republicans of Minnesota won a majority of seats, its first majority since the return of partisan elections to the House in 1974, defeating the majority of the Minnesota Democratic–Farmer–Labor Party (DFL). The new Legislature convened on January 8, 1985.

Results

See also
 Minnesota Senate election, 1982
 Minnesota gubernatorial election, 1982

References

1984 Minnesota elections
Minnesota House of Representatives elections
1984 state legislature elections in the United States